Leslie Alexander Johnson (15 July 1903 – 14 June 1979) was an Australian rules footballer who played with Carlton in the Victorian Football League (VFL).

Notes

External links 

Les Johnson's profile at Blueseum
 

1903 births
1979 deaths
Carlton Football Club players
Maryborough Football Club players
Australian rules footballers from Victoria (Australia)
People from Maryborough, Victoria